A honeymoon registry is a service, typically on the Internet, that assists engaged and married couples in financing their honeymoons.

History

Honeymoon registries (also known as a "travel registry" - a registry for travel related items) began in the 1990s as an additional service provided by travel agents and agencies.  Some are still set up in this manner and require the wedding couple to use their travel agency to book their honeymoon.  More recent honeymoon registries are not involved with the planning and booking of the honeymoon. Instead, they provide the couple with a customizable web page to share their honeymoon plans with others and accept gifts toward the honeymoon.  As "non-traditional" registry options such as a honeymoon registry become more popular, large registry services have added this option to complement their "traditional" fare.

Services offered

Most honeymoon registries allow a couple to create and customize a registry web page with photos and details of their upcoming wedding and honeymoon.  Wedding guests are invited to visit the registry site so they may contribute a monetary gift to cover a portion of the honeymoon or a specific activity as detailed by the couple.

For example, a couple may list dinner at an elegant restaurant, scuba diving lessons, or portions of hotel and airfare.  These activities are displayed in an organized and user-friendly inventory format on their customized registry page. As wedding guests browse the registry page, they can make a gift, typically using a credit card, of any of the listed activities or give a general monetary gift of any amount towards the honeymoon.

Other common features of honeymoon registries:

 Messaging systems that allow wedding couples to email preformatted notices of their registry to wedding guests as well as print out invitation inserts.  Some services mail  invitation inserts to the wedding couple, but usually charge a fee to do so.
 Full tracking of gifts to assist couples in creating “Thank You” cards.
 Gift redemption is typically via mailed check, but some services provide wire services as an option.

Etiquette

As noted by The Wall Street Journal in a May 2008 review of popular honeymoon registry services:

"A honeymoon is a perfectly appropriate gift to request," says Peter Post, president of the Emily Post Institute, a Burlington, Vt., etiquette think tank. "There's no objection to it from an etiquette point of view."

Pros and cons

The positive aspects of honeymoon registries include helping the bride and groom register for experiences that may be more memorable than a traditional physical gift. The experiences become more affordable, and the process can be simpler that just giving a cash gift.

The negative aspects of honeymoon registries include the perceived stigma of asking for money, and the associated service fees charged by some registries.

References

Wedding gifts